The Messenger was an early 20th-century political and literary magazine by and for African-American people in the United States. It was important to the flowering of the Harlem Renaissance and initially promoted a socialist political view. The Messenger was co-founded in New York City by Chandler Owen and A. Philip Randolph in August 1917.

After 1920, The Messenger featured more articles about black culture and began to publish rising black writers. It became a kind of literary magazine (like The Little Review, the revived The Dial, and The Liberator), contributing to the Harlem Renaissance. It was notable for helping strengthen African-American intellectual and political identity in the age of Jim Crow. Through the 1920s it also noted the success of blacks who were reaching the middle class in business and the professions, publishing a series of essays known as "These 'Colored' United States", submitted by writers across the country.

History
Toward the end of 1916, A. Philip Randolph and Chandler Owen dropped out of college, joined the Socialist Party, and gave soapbox orations on street corners around Harlem. Their socialist and labor union propagandizing gained them celebrity in the area. When they walked into the office building at 486 Lenox Avenue, while looking for a meeting space for their Independent Political Council, they were recognized by William White, President of the Headwaiters and Sidewaiters Society of Greater New York. He suggested they move into his society's headquarters and edit a monthly magazine for waiters.

From January until August 1917, Randolph and Owen published the Hotel Messenger. But their exposé of union corruption (wherein the headwaiters were selling uniforms to sidewaiters at high prices and pocketing the kickbacks from uniform dealers) resulted in their immediate dismissal.

They moved into an office next door at 513 Lenox Avenue. With the patronage of Randolph's wife Lucille, they launched The Messenger. The first issue cost 15 cents (its price would never change) and ran the mission statement written by Randolph and Owen:
"Our aim is to appeal to reason, to lift our pens above the cringing demagogy of the times, and above the cheap peanut politics of the old reactionary Negro leaders. [This was a reference to Booker T. Washington, who promoted rural skills and compromise at Tuskegee Institute.] Patriotism has no appeal to us; justice has. Party has no weight with us; principle has. Loyalty is meaningless; it depends on what one is loyal to. Prayer is not one of our remedies; it depends on what one is praying for. We consider prayer as nothing more than a fervent wish; consequently the merit and worth of a prayer depend upon what the fervent wish is".

Declaring that "with us, economics and politics take precedence to music and art", the magazine's first two years were primarily devoted to advocating black labor unionism and socialism, and denouncing the War and its effects on black Americans. The magazine attacked President Woodrow Wilson's call to make "the world safe for democracy", when the black community was at risk in the U.S. Since the late 19th century, it had suffered a high rate of lynchings and violence in the South. At the turn of the century, most blacks were disenfranchised by changes in state law across the region that raised barriers to voter registration. They were excluded from the political system. The editors of the Messenger also criticized major northern black figures such as W. E. B. Du Bois, who was pro-war at the time, and Marcus Garvey, an activist from Jamaica. They believed that Garvey's program to "repatriate" native-born American black citizens to Africa was illogical and far fetched.

The Messenger declared: 
"No intelligent Negro is willing to lay down his life for the United States as it now exists. Intelligent Negroes have now reached the point where their support of the country is conditional". Such statements led to Justice Department agents ransacking the Messenger'''s editorial office in the dead of night, breaking furniture and confiscating back issues. Randolph and Owen conducted a public speaking tour against the war, appearing in Chicago and Cleveland, while selling copies of their fiery July 1918 issue.

Reaching Cleveland on 4 August, Randolph and Owen took turns addressing the mass meeting gathered by the city's Socialist Party leader Walter Bronstrup. He sold issues of the Messenger in the crowd until an undercover Justice Department official bought an issue and broke up the meeting. The DOJ official pulled Randolph from the stage, arrested him and Owen, and held them the following day for investigation. Randolph and Owen were held for trial under charges of violating the Espionage Act by: 
"unlawfully, knowingly and feloniously, the United States being then and there at war with the Imperial German Government, willfully print and cause to be printed, publish and cause to be published, circulated, in a certain language intended to incite, provoke and incur resistance to the United States and to promote the cause of its enemies in a certain publication known as the Messenger.”

After two days in jail, the two men were brought to trial. The judge, looking at the two men and what they had written, said that he could not believe they were old enough, or, being black, smart enough to write that "red-hot stuff". He did not doubt that they were being used by white socialists who had written the editorials for them. He said there would be no trial and ordered Randolph and Owen returned to their parents' homes; telling them to leave town quickly. The men continued their tour. When they returned to New York, they learned that the Postmaster General Albert Burleson had denied second-class mailing privileges to their magazine because of its content.

Socialism failed to attract followers in Harlem. By February 1920 the Messenger identified as "A Journal of Scientific Radicalism;” in June 1923, it billed itself as "The World’s Greatest Negro Monthly". It published increasing amounts of poetry, stories, and other work of Harlem intellectuals as the area became the center for black culture.
	
Although lacking a literary editor, The Messenger was influential in the Harlem Renaissance; it published a range of new writers before they had reached literary reputations. Theophilus Lewis, the magazine's drama critic from September 1923 till May 1926, supported the African-American little theatre movement, and helped develop a black aesthetic in the theater. Lewis may have been untrained and was not paid for his contributions (apparently the Messenger offices paid only for his cab fare to and from shows), but his enthusiasm for the theater led to well-developed criticism. He helped shape African-American theater on many levels, from the little theaters to Broadway.

Lewis helped recruit Wallace Thurman to the magazine as a contributing editor. He later founded the influential magazine Fire!! Thurman worked at The Messenger from late 1925 to 1926 and helped to publish Zora Neale Hurston's "Eatonville Anthology", as well as the early stories of Langston Hughes (Hurston and Hughes joined Thurman as an editors of Fire!!). Thurman also became known for his novels The Blacker the Berry and Infants of Spring. George S. Schuyler, a staple of the magazine for his satiric column "Shafts and Darts" (which he sometimes wrote with help from Lewis), contributed the piece "Hobohemia" to the Messenger. He became a correspondent and Chief Editorial Writer for the Pittsburgh Courier. Schuyler earned some renown for his satirical novel Black No More.
	
While the magazine was based in Harlem, its essays from the 1920s onward took a look at black culture across the whole nation with contributors such as Schuyler, Thurman, Lewis, E. Franklin Frazier and others (see: Tom Lutz and Susanna Ashton's edited collection of a series of essays from this period known as "These 'Colored' United States"). In 2004, Adam McKible "discovered" and helped reprint Edward Christopher Williams’ anonymously published serialized novel, The Letters of Davy Carr. Republished as When Washington Was in Vogue, Williams' book is a slyly humorous and culturally critical epistolary novel following members of the black bourgeoisie in 1920s Washington, D.C. Other contributors of note include Arna Bontemps, who later wrote Story of the Negro, and Claude McKay, whose poem, "If We Must Die", was reprinted in the Messenger as an anti-lynching, pro-self-defense statement to all African-Americans.

The magazine was always in such debt that it did not publish at all during some months where coeditors were on fundraising lecture tours. Contributors received only token payments. Money problems forced the magazine to change offices after being evicted from its first base. They were evicted again after three years, and leased space at 2311 Seventh Avenue. It published from there until folding in 1928 from lack of funds.

Social influence
In addition to providing a platform for African-American literature, The Messenger published much political writing. Randolph also served as editor for The Socialist magazine. Writers published in The Messenger tackled issues which other journals and magazines avoided. The Messenger was notable for its critical perspective during the Harlem Renaissance. It was described as "The most feared black publication" during its reigning era from 1917 until 1928. Randolph and his wife Lucille ran for secretary of state and the state legislature of New York on the Socialist ticket in 1917. The January issue of 1918 supported Bolshevism in Russia after its revolution.The Messenger became a voice for those who were oppressed socially and economically. Many people would have suffered injustice for a longer period of time had it not been for The Messenger. For eleven years, it paved the way for social justice and equality. It was respected by many. Its influence was also described in 1919 by the U.S. Justice Department: "the most able and the most dangerous of all Negro publications.". Randolph and Owen did not believe that blacks should participate in the Great War because they did not have political equality in the United States. When questioned on his views, Randolph wrote what he described as a "satirical and sarcastic" response.
He wrote:
"the Negro may be choosing between being burnt by Tennessee, Georgia or Texas mobs or being shot by Germans in Belgium. We don't know about this pro-Germanism among Negroes. It may be only their anti-Americanism -meaning anti-lynching."

"Garvey Must Go" campaignThe Messenger openly critiqued Marcus Mosiah Garvey's theory of Black Nationalism. Garvey had immigrated from Jamaica. His pan-African approach promoted the "return" of [blacks] from the United States and the Caribbean, to "go back to Africa, and more basically, back to their own blackness". Randolph and Owen criticized Garvey's goal of re-populating the African continent solely with blacks and his promotion of the idea in the United States. "Even the Senegalese French Deputy, Blaise Diagne, agreed that Africa was too diverse and fragmented for Garvey’s black Zionism to be realized". Instead, the editors wanted to present "the possibilities of an American future devoid of lynching and Jim Crow, discrimination and prejudice".

They believed that Garvey's ideas diverted African Americans from working on current racial issues and change in the United States. Randolph and Owen started the "Garvey Must Go" campaign in 1922, with the goal of getting Garvey deported. This appeared to contradict their original mission statement. "Chandler Owen explained that historically radicals had opposed deportation only in cases of expression of political or class war opinions".

Garvey and the editors of The Messenger represented competing strains of thought among African-American leaders in Harlem and the United States. In the small world of Harlem, Garvey rented offices for his Universal Negro Improvement Association (UNIA) in the same building as those of The Messenger.

Randolph and Owen continued to criticize Garvey. In the September 1922 issue, they described Garvey as a tool of the recently revived Ku Klux Klan (KKK), saying he was "the chief hat-in-hand, me-too-boss 'good nigger' puppet of the Ku Klux Klan Kleagle, Edward Young Clarke of Georgia.”

Business era
During the 1920s, the Messenger also published a series of essays known as "These 'Colored' United States", from January 1923 through September 1926. Articles were submitted by writers from across the nation, reporting on the rise of middle-class blacks in business and the professions. One such article was published in 1924 by T. Gillis Nutter, an attorney and former state representative of West Virginia (1918–1920), elected at a time when most blacks had been closed out of statewide office by disenfranchisement across the South at the turn of the century. He reported on 28 successful men and women in business, the professions and teaching, as well as crops produced by black farmers in the state, and other property held by them.

Further reading
 Jervis Anderson, A. Philip Randolph: A Biographical Portrait, New York: Harcourt, Brace, Jovanovich, 1973.
 Susanna M. Ashton and Tom Lutz (eds), These "Colored" United States: African American Essays from the 1920s, New Brunswick, NJ: Rutgers University Press, 1996.
 William G. Jordan, Black Newspapers & America's War for Democracy, 1914–1920, Chapel Hill and London: University of North Carolina Press, 2001.
 Theodore Kornweibel, Jr., "The 'Garvey Must Go' Campaign", in No Crystal Stair: Black Life and the Messenger, 1917–1928, Westport, CN: Greenwood, 1975. pp. 132–75.
 Theodore Kornweibel, Jr., Seeing Red, Bloomington, IN: Indiana University Press, 1998. 
 Edward Christopher Williams, When Washington Was in Vogue: A Lost Novel of the Harlem Renaissance''. New York: HarperCollins, 2004. .

Citations

External links
 American Federation of Labor – Congress of Industrial Unions website.
 "A. Philip Randolph Award", National Newspapers Publishers Association.
 "Messenger Magazine", Spartacus Educational.
 "Marcus Garvey", Public Broadcasting Service, Boston.

1917 establishments in New York (state)
1928 disestablishments in the United States
African-American magazines
Defunct political magazines published in the United States
Defunct literary magazines published in the United States
Harlem Renaissance
Magazines established in 1917
Magazines disestablished in 1928
Magazines published in New York City
Modernism
Monthly magazines published in the United States